Dawayao is a station on Line 14 of the Beijing Subway. This station opened on May 5, 2013.

Station Layout 
The station has an underground island platform.

Exits 
There are 3 exits, lettered A, B, and D. Exit A is accessible.

References

Railway stations in China opened in 2013
Beijing Subway stations in Fengtai District